Bariano is a comune (municipality) in the Province of Bergamo in the Italian region of Lombardy, located about  east of Milan and about  south of Bergamo.

Bariano borders the following municipalities: Caravaggio, Fara Olivana con Sola, Fornovo San Giovanni, Morengo, Pagazzano, Romano di Lombardia.

References

External links
 Official website